Connor Questa was a rock band from Argentina, formed in 2010 and dissolved in 2015. Throughout his career, only two albums released materials and their musical style was influenced by grunge, funk, heavy metal and soul . Early in his career, they are calling themselves "Marilina Connor Questa".

Marilina Bertoldi, began touring the City stages with her songs and her guitar solo format. After uploading several videos in Internet with records of visits, began the search for musicians to orchestrate those ideas that drew its particular voice. During the recording of their first EP , the band consolidated its power proposal and became a group project.

The band broke up in early 2015, by differences among its members.

Discography 

The band released only two albums:
 Marilina Connor Questa (EP) – 2010
 Somos por partes (We are in parts) – 2011
 Fuego al universo (Fire the universe) – 2013

Singles

See also 
 Argentine rock

References

External links 

Connor Questa My Space

Argentine rock music groups
Musical groups established in 2010
Musical groups disestablished in 2015
Musical groups from Buenos Aires
2010 establishments in Argentina
Argentine alternative rock groups